Yulin Township is a township under the administration of Jian'an District, Xuchang, Henan, China. , it has two residential communities and 29 villages under its administration.

References 

Township-level divisions of Henan
Xuchang